Per Samuelshaug (26 August 1905 – 4 January 1990) was a Norwegian cross-country skier from Alvdal who participated at the 1936 Winter Olympics. He won the 50 km race at the Holmenkollen ski festival in 1937.

Cross-country skiing results

Olympic Games

World Championships

References

External links

1905 births
1990 deaths
People from Alvdal
Norwegian male cross-country skiers
Olympic cross-country skiers of Norway
Cross-country skiers at the 1936 Winter Olympics
Holmenkollen Ski Festival winners
Sportspeople from Innlandet